Adventure Theatre-MTC is the longest-running children's theatre in the Washington, D.C. area. Located in Glen Echo Park in Glen Echo, Maryland, it has been performing for children since 1951 and educating children in creative drama since 1978.

History
Adventure Theatre was founded in 1951 by a group of women from the Community Arts Association’s drama classes.

In 1955 Adventure Theatre began commissioning plays by children’s theater playwrights Flora Atkins and Helen Avery.

The In-School Players, a traveling troupe, was launched in 1969 as a result of a request by the Director of Language Arts for the District of Columbia Public Schools. The In-School Players remains a vital part of AT programming.

Adventure Theatre moved into a new permanent space of its own in 1971 after years of touring, at Glen Echo Park, its current location.

For 1974–79, Adventure Theatre expanded programming by partnering with the Junior League to create The Picture Book Players, a performance troupe for pre-school and early elementary-aged children. Adventure Theatre also began offering its first theater-education classes and created a puppet division, now The Puppet Co., another resident of Glen Echo Park.

In 1986 New Plays Books published Six Adventure Theatre Plays, which were distributed to bookstores and children’s theaters around the country. The County Council of Montgomery County proclaimed June as “Adventure Theatre Month,” in honor of the theater’s 35 years of service.

Renovation of the home space was completed in 2007. The extensive renovation includes a theatre, new rehearsal spaces, and room for an expanded administrative staff.

See also
Cultural Alliance of Greater Washington
League of Washington Theaters
Theater in Maryland

Notes

References

 
 *
Got Plans? With Kids, January 21, 2004 - WashingtonPost.com
Adventure Theatre: “How Old is a Hero?”, February 10, 2008 – DCUrbanMom.com
What’s Happening,  May 29, 2008 – Washington Post.com
Best Bets, June 12, 2008 – Washington Post.com
Adventure Theatre’s New Season, June 25, 2008 – WashingtonPost.com
News Archive for June, 2008 – Potomac Stages
Cultural Capital.com
Clara Barton National Historic Site

League of Washington Theatres
Members of the Cultural Alliance of Greater Washington
Theatres in Maryland
Theatrical organizations in the United States
Tourist attractions in Montgomery County, Maryland
1951 establishments in Maryland
Performing groups established in 1951